Jack Wendler is a former art gallery owner who co-founded the fine arts journal Art Monthly in 1976. Between December 1971 and July 1974 the Jack Wendler Gallery held 26 exhibitions in five London locations—including a show by American artist Robert Barry. In 1991, together with artist Liam Gillick, he founded the limited editions and publishing company G-W Press ("Gillick-Wendler Press"). The company produced limited editions by artists including Jeremy Deller and Anya Gallaccio.

References

Year of birth missing (living people)
Living people
American expatriates in the United Kingdom
British art dealers